Malachi Smith is a Jamaican dub poet.

Biography
Malachi Smith was born in Jamaica in the parish of Westmoreland, and grew up in Clarendon, St. Elizabeth and St. Catherine, staying with various family members. The son of a preacher, Smith began writing poetry at the age of eight, and recorded his first poem, Kimbo to Kimbo, in 1979. His other CDs are Blacker the Berry - The Sweeter The Cherry, Throw Two Punch (1998), Middle Passage and Luv Dub Fever. He is currently working on a new CD project Hail to Jamaica, a collection that will feature most of his award-winning poems about Jamaica. Smith won the 2009 most outstanding writer award for the Jamaica Development Commission's Creative Writing Competition.

A retired member of the Jamaica Constabulary Force at the rank of detective corporal, Malachi is based in Miami.

References

Jamaican musicians
Living people
People from Westmoreland Parish
Jamaican dub poets
20th-century Jamaican poets
21st-century Jamaican poets
Jamaican male poets
20th-century male writers
21st-century male writers
Year of birth missing (living people)